HSLuv or HslUV may refer to:
 HslVU, a protein
 HslUV protease, an enzyme
 HSLuv, a colorspace